Food history is an interdisciplinary field that examines the history and the cultural, economic, environmental, and sociological impacts of food and human nutrition. It is considered distinct from the more traditional field of culinary history, which focuses on the origin and recreation of specific recipes.

The first journal in the field, Petits Propos Culinaires, was launched in 1979 and the first conference on the subject was the 1981 Oxford Food Symposium.

Food and diets in history 
Early human nutrition was largely determined by the availability and palatability of foods. Humans evolved as omnivorous hunter-gatherers, though the diet of humans has varied significantly depending on location and climate. The diet in the tropics tended to depend more heavily on plant foods, while the diet at higher latitudes tended more towards animal products. Analyses of postcranial and cranial remains of humans and animals from the Neolithic, along with detailed bone-modification studies, have shown that cannibalism also occurred among prehistoric humans.

Agriculture developed at different times in different places, starting about 11,500 years ago, providing some cultures with a more abundant supply of grains (such as wheat, rice and maize) and potatoes; and originating staples such as bread, pasta dough, and tortillas. The domestication of animals provided some cultures with milk and dairy products.

In 2020, archeological research discovered a frescoed thermopolium (a fast-food counter) in an exceptional state of preservation from 79 CE/AD in Pompeii, including 2,000-year-old foods available in some of the deep terra cotta jars.

Classical antiquity 

During classical antiquity, diets consisted of simple fresh or preserved whole foods that were either locally grown or transported from neighboring areas during times of crisis.

5th to 15th century: Middle Ages in Western Europe 

In western Europe, medieval cuisine (5th–15th century) did not change rapidly.

Cereals remained the most important staple during the early Middle Ages. Barley, oats and rye were eaten by the poor. Standard foods included  bread, porridge, and gruel. Fava beans and vegetables were important supplements to the cereal-based diet of the lower orders.  Meat was expensive and prestigious. Game was common only on the tables of landowners. The most prevalent butcher's meats were pork, chicken, and other domestic fowl; beef, which required greater investment in land, was less common. Cod and herring were mainstays among the northern populations; dried, smoked or salted, they made their way far inland, but a wide variety of other saltwater and freshwater fish was also eaten.

The meals people ate were controlled by the seasons, geography, and religious restrictions. For most people food supply was limited to what the nearby lands and seas could provide. Peasants made do with what they could, primarily cooking over an open fire, in a cauldron or on a spit. Their ovens were typically outside of the home, and made on top of clay or turf.  Poor families primarily consumed grains and vegetables in the form of stew, soup, or pottage, and anything grown on their own small plots of land. They were unable to afford spices, and it was a crime for them to hunt deer, boar, or rabbits. Their staples included rye or barley bread, stews, local dairy products, cheaper meats like beef, pork or lamb, fish if there was access to freshwater, vegetables and herbs grown at home, fruit from local trees and bushes, nuts, and honey.  The upper class and nobility had better food and diet than that the lower classes, but food was eaten in small portions. Meals were laid out with many different colors and flavors—a very different experience from those in the lower class. Smaller portion sizes developed around this time due to various cultural influences, and these large, table-long meals were essentially picked at by the nobility. Foods were highly spiced, and many of these were expensively imported, often from outside Europe. The Middle Ages diet of the upper class and nobility included manchet bread, a variety of meats like venison, pork, and lamb, fish and shellfish, spices, cheese, fruits, and a limited number of vegetables.

As food consumption was controlled by geography and availability, it was also governed by the Church. Many fasts occurred throughout the year, and the longest was that of Lent.  There were designated days in which people could not eat meat or fish, but this did not affect the poor very much because of their already-lacking food options. The Church also influenced people to have feasts throughout the year, including on Christmas and for lesser holidays. The noble and upper classes participated in these extravagant feasts, as they often followed a fasting period.

16th century: Importance of Spain and Portugal 

The Portuguese and Spanish Empires opened up sea trade routes that linked food exchange across the world. Under Phillip II, Catholic cuisine elements inadvertently helped transform the cuisine of the Americas, Buddhists, Hindus, and Islamic cuisines of the South Eastern Asian region. In Goa, the Portuguese were encouraged by the Crown to marry local women following their conversion. This integration led to mixed cuisine between Portugal and Western India. The Portuguese brought round raised loaves, using wheat shipped from Northern India, as well as pickled pork. The pork was pickled in wine or vinegar with garlic (carne de vinha d’alhos) tied to Portuguese cuisine that later became vindaloo.

18th century: early modern Europe 
Grain and livestock have long been the most important agricultural products in France and England. After 1700, innovative farmers experimented with new techniques to increase yield and looked into new products such as hops, oilseed rape, artificial grasses, vegetables, fruit, dairy foods, commercial poultry, rabbits, and freshwater fish.

Sugar began as an upper-class luxury product, but by 1700 Caribbean sugar plantations worked by African slaves had expanded production, and it was much more widely available. By 1800 sugar was a staple of working-class diets. For them, it symbolized increasing economic freedom and status.

Labourers in Western Europe in the 18th century ate bread and gruel, often in a soup with greens and lentils, a little bacon, and occasionally potato or a bit of cheese. They washed it down with beer (water usually was too contaminated), and a sip of milk. Three quarters of the food was derived from plants. Meat was much more attractive, but very expensive.

19th century 
By 1870, the West European diet was at about 16 kilograms per person per year of meat, rising to 50 kilograms by 1914, and 77 kilograms in 2010. Milk and cheese were seldom in the diet; even in the early 20th century, they were still uncommon in Mediterranean diets.

In the immigrant neighbourhoods of fast-growing American industrial cities, housewives purchased ready-made food through street peddlers, hucksters, push carts, and small shops operated from private homes. This opened the way for the rapid entry of entirely new items such as pizza, spaghetti with meatballs, bagels, hoagies, pretzels, and pierogies into American eating habits, and firmly established fast food in the American culinary experience.

20th century 
In the first half of the 20th century there were two world wars, which in many places resulted in rationing and hunger; sometimes the starvation of the civilian populations was used as a powerful new weapon.

World War I and after 

In Germany during World War I, the rationing system in urban areas virtually collapsed, with people eating animal fodder to survive the Turnip Winter.  Conditions in Vienna worsened as the army got priority in the food supply.

In Allied countries, meat was diverted first to the soldiers, then to urgent civilian needs in Italy, Britain, France and Greece. Meat production was stretched to the limit in the United States, Australia, New Zealand, Canada and Argentina, with oceanic shipping closely controlled by the British. Food shortages were severe in Russian cities, leading to protests that escalated and helped topple the Tsar in February 1917.

In the first years of peace after the war ended in 1918, most of eastern and central Europe suffered severe food shortages. The American Relief Administration (ARA) was set up under the American wartime "food czar" Herbert Hoover, and was charged with providing emergency food rations across Central and Eastern Europe. The ARA fed millions, including the inhabitants of Germany and the Soviet Union. After U.S. government funding for the ARA expired in the summer of 1919, the ARA became a private organization, raising millions of dollars from private donors. Under the auspices of the ARA, the European Children's Fund fed millions of starving children.

The 1920s saw the introduction of new foodstuffs, especially fruit, transported from around the globe. After the World War many new food products became available to the typical household, with branded foods advertised for their convenience. Now instead of an experienced cook spending hours on difficult custards and puddings, the housewife could purchase instant foods in jars, or powders that could be quickly mixed. Wealthier households now had ice boxes or electric refrigerators, which made for better storage and the convenience of buying in larger quantities.

World War II and after 

During World War II, Nazi Germany tried to feed its population by seizing food supplies from occupied countries, and deliberately cutting off food supplies to Jews, Poles, Russians and the Dutch.

As part of the Marshall Plan in 1948–1950, the United States provided technological expertise and financing for high-productivity large-scale agribusiness operations in postwar Europe. Poultry was a favorite choice, with the rapid expansion in production, a sharp fall in prices, and widespread acceptance of the many ways to serve chicken.

The Green Revolution in the 1950s and 1960s was a technological breakthrough in plant productivity that increased agricultural production worldwide, particularly in the developing world. Research began in the 1930s and dramatic improvements in output became important in the late 1960s. The initiatives resulted in the adoption of new technologies, including:

Consumption history of notable food

Potato

The potato was first domesticated in the region of modern-day southern Peru and extreme northwestern Bolivia. It has since spread around the world and become a staple crop in many countries.

Some believe that the introduction of the potato was responsible for a quarter or more of the growth in Old World population and urbanization between 1700 and 1900. Following the Spanish conquest of the Inca Empire, the Spanish introduced the potato to Europe in the second half of the 16th century, as part of the Columbian exchange. The staple was subsequently transported by European mariners to territories and ports throughout the world. The potato was slow to be adopted by distrustful European farmers, but soon enough it became an important food staple and field crop that played a major role in the 19th century European population boom. However, lack of genetic diversity, due to the very limited number of varieties initially introduced, left the crop vulnerable to disease. There are few mentions of potato being cultivated in India in the travel accounts of Mr. Edward Terry and Mr. Fyer during 17th century. Potato is said to be introduced in India by Portuguese in early 17th century. The Portuguese called it 'batata'. Indians later adapted a different word for potato, they called it 'alu'--this name came up under British Rule. In 1845, a plant disease known as late blight, caused by the fungus-like oomycete Phytophthora infestans, spread rapidly through the poorer communities of western Ireland as well as parts of the Scottish Highlands, resulting in the crop failures that led to the Great Irish Famine. Currently China is the largest potato producing country followed by India as of 2017, FAOSTAT, Food and Agriculture Organization of the United Nations.

Rice
Rice comes from the seasonal plant Oryza sativa, and has been cultivated since about 6000 BCE. The principal rice-producing countries are in East and South Asia.The origin place of rice has always been a hot point of debate between India and China as both countries started cultivating it around the same time period (says numerous history books and records). The average amount of rice cultivated every year ranges between 800 billion and 950 billion pounds. Muslims brought rice to Sicily in the 9th century. After the 15th century, rice spread throughout Italy and then France, later spreading to all the continents during the age of European exploration. As a cereal grain, today it is the most widely consumed staple food worldwide. Currently India is leading rice producing country according to FAOSTAT, Food and Agriculture Organization of the United Nations.

Sugar 

Sugar originated from India by taking sugarcane plant through some chemical and mechanical processes. The word sugar is derived from a Sanskrit word शर्करा (sarkara). Previously people used to chew the juice out of sugarcane to enjoy the sweetness of the plants. Later, Indians found the technique to crystallize the sweet liquid. This technique then spread towards the neighbouring countries of India.  The Spanish and Portuguese empires provided sugar for Europe by the late seventeenth century from New World plantations. Brazil became the dominant sugar producer.

Sugar was expensive during Middle Ages. Due to the increase of sugar cultivation, obtaining sugar became easier and more affordable. Thus, Europeans could now enjoy Islamic-inspired confectionary goods that were previously costly to produce. The Jesuits were leading producers of chocolate, obtaining it from the Amazon jungle and Guatemala and shipping it across the world to Southeast Asia, Spain and Italy. They introduced Mesoamerican techniques to Europe for processing and preparing chocolate. Fermented cocoa beans had to ground on heated grindstones to prevent producing oily chocolate, a process that was foreign to many Europeans. As a beverage, chocolate remained largely within the Catholic world as it was not considered a food to the church and thus could be enjoyed during fasting. Brazil is currently largest producer of sugar, followed by India, which is also the largest consumer of sugar.

Historical impact of religion on cuisines 
The three most widespread religions (Christianity, Buddhism, and Islam) developed their own distinct recipes, cultures, and practices around food.  All three follow two main principles around food: "the theory of the culinary cosmos and the principle of hierarchy." There is a third principle that involved sacrifice. Over the years, religious and societal views on killing living things for religious purposes have changed, and it is no longer considered a major principle.

Judaism 

Jews have eaten many different types of food that were no different than the cuisine of their Gentile neighbors. However, Jewish cuisine is influenced by Jewish dietary laws, kashrut along with other religious requirements. For example, creating a fire was forbidden on Shabbat which led to inspiration for slow-cooked Sabbath stews. Sephardic Jews were expelled from Iberia in 1492 and migrated to North Africa and the Ottoman lands, blending Iberian cuisine with local cuisine.

Many foods considered Jewish in the United States, such as bagels, knishes and borscht are Eastern European Ashkenazi dishes. Gentiles also ate the above foods widely throughout Eastern Europe as well.

Jesuits 
The Jesuits' influence on cuisine differed from country to country. They sold maize and cassava to plantations in Angola that would later grant provisions to slave traders. They exported sugar and cacao from the Americas to Europe, and in southern parts of the Americas, they dried leaves of the local mate plant that would compete with coffee, tea, and chocolate as the favored hot beverage in Europe. Despite mate's popularity and competition against chocolate, the Jesuits were the leading producers and promoters of chocolate. Using indigenous labor in Guatemala, they shipped it across the world to Southeast Asia, Spain, and Italy. Chocolate's popularity was also in part to the theological consensus that, because it was not considered a food, it could be eaten while fasting. It was thought to have lust-reducing effects applicable to many nuns and monks at the time. The Jesuits introduced several foods and cooking techniques to Japan: deep frying (tempura), cakes and confectionery (kasutera, confetti), as well as the bread still called by the Iberian name pan.

Significance of Islamic cuisine in Eurasia

See also

 Early impact of Mesoamerican goods in Iberian society
 Food studies
 List of ancient dishes
 List of historical cuisines
 List of food and beverage museums
 Timeline of food

Further reading
 
  Collingham, Lizzie. Taste of War: World War II and the Battle for Food (2013) 
 Gremillion, Kristen J. Ancestral Appetites: Food in Prehistory (Cambridge UP,  2011) 188 pages; explores the processes of dietary adaptation in prehistory that contributed to the diversity of global foodways.
 Grew, Raymond. Food in Global History, Westview Press, 2000
 Heiser Charles B. Seed to civilisation. The story of food (Harvard UP, 1990)
 Kiple, Kenneth F. and Kriemhild Coneè Ornelas, eds. The Cambridge World History of Food, (2 vol, 2000).
 Katz, Solomon ed. The Encyclopedia of Food and Culture (Scribner, 2003)
 Lacey, Richard. Hard to swallow: a brief history of food (1994) online free
 
 Mintz, Sidney. Tasting Food, Tasting Freedom: Excursions into Eating, Power, and the Past, (1997).
 Nestle, Marion. Food Politics: How the Food Industry Influences Nutrition and Health (2nd ed 2007).
 
 Parasecoli, Fabio & Peter Scholliers, eds.  A Cultural History of Food, 6 volumes (Berg Publishers, 2012)
 Pilcher, Jeffrey M. ed. The Oxford Handbook of Food History (2017). Online review
 Pilcher, Jeffrey M. Food in World History (2017) advanced survey
 Ritchie, Carson I.A. Food in civilization: how history has been affected by human tastes (1981) online free
 Vernon, James. Hunger: A Modern History (Harvard UP, 2007).

Foods and meals
 Abbott,  Elizabeth. Sugar: A Bittersweet History (2015) 464pp.
 Albala, Ken. Beans: A History (2007).
 Anderson, Heather Arndt. Breakfast: A History (2014) 238pp
 Atkins, Peter. Liquid Materialities: A History of Milk, Science and the Law (Ashgate, 2010).
 Blake, Michael. Maize for the Gods: Unearthing the 9,000-Year History of Corn (2015).
 Collingham, Lizzie. Curry: A Tale of Cooks and Conquerors (2007)
 Elias, Megan. Lunch: A History (2014) 204pp
 Foster, Nelson Foster and Linda S. Cordell. Chilies to Chocolate: Food the Americas Gave the World (1992)
 Kindstedt, Paul. Cheese and Culture: A History of Cheese and its Place in Western Civilization (2012)
 Kurlansky, Mark. Milk!: A 10,000-Year Food Fracas (2018). excerpt
 Kurlansky, Mark. Salt: A World History (2003)  excerpt
 Martin, Laura C. A History of Tea: The Life and Times of the World's Favorite Beverage (2018) excerpt
 Mintz, Sidney.  Sweetness and Power: The Place of Sugar in Modern History (1986) 
 Morris, Jonathan. Coffee: A Global History (2019) excerpt
 Pettigrew, Jane, and Bruce Richardson. A Social History of Tea: Tea's Influence on Commerce, Culture & Community (2015).
 Piatti-Farnell, Lorna. Beef: A Global History (2013)  excerpt
 Reader, John. Propitious Esculent: The Potato in World History (2008), 315pp a standard scholarly history
 Salaman, R.N. The history and social influence of the potato (1949)
 Smith, Andrew F. Sugar: A Global History (2015)   excerpt
 Valenze, Deborah,.  Milk: A Local and Global History (Yale UP, 2012)

Historiography
 Claflin, Kyri and Peter Scholliers, eds. Writing Food History, a Global Perspective (Berg, 2012)
 De La Peña, Carolyn, and Benjamin N. Lawrance. "Introduction: Traversing the local/global and food/culture divides." Food and Foodways 19.1-2 (2011): 1-10.
 Duffett, Rachel, and Ina Zweiniger-Bargielowska, eds. Food and War in Twentieth Century Europe (2011) excerpt
 Otter, Chris. "The British Nutrition Transition and its Histories", History Compass 10/11 (2012): pp. 812–825, [DOI]: 10.1111/hic3.12001
 Peters Kernan, Sarah. "Recent Trends in Food History Research in the United States: 2017-19." Food & History (Jan 2021), Vol. 18 Issue 1/2, pp 233–240. 
 Pilcher, Jeffrey M. "The embodied imagination in recent writings on food history." American Historical Review 121#3 (2016): 861–887.
 Pilcher, Jeffrey M., ed. Food History: Critical and Primary Sources (2015) 4 vol; reprints 76 primary and secondary sources.
 Scholliers, Peter. " Twenty-five Years of Studying un Phénomène Social Total:  Food History Writing on Europe in the Nineteenth and Twentieth Centuries," Food, Culture & Society: An International Journal of Multidisciplinary Research (2007) 10#3 pp 449–471 https://doi.org/10.2752/155280107X239881
 Woolgar, Christopher M. "Food and the middle ages." Journal of Medieval History 36.1 (2010): 1-19.

Asia
 Achaya, Kongandra Thammu. A historical dictionary of Indian food (New Delhi: Oxford UP, 1998).
 Cheung, Sidney, and David Y.H. Wu. The globalisation of Chinese food (Routledge, 2014).
 Chung, Hae Kyung, et al. "Understanding Korean food culture from Korean paintings." Journal of Ethnic Foods 3#1 (2016): 42–50.
 Cwiertka, Katarzyna Joanna. Modern Japanese cuisine: Food, power and national identity (Reaktion Books, 2006).
 Kim, Soon Hee, et al. "Korean diet: characteristics and historical background." Journal of Ethnic Foods 3.1 (2016): 26–31.
 Kushner, Barak. Slurp! a Social and Culinary History of Ramen: Japan's Favorite Noodle Soup (2014) a scholarly cultural history over 1000 years
 Simoons, Frederick J. Food in China: a cultural and historical inquiry (2014).

Europe
 Gentilcore, David. Food and Health in Early Modern Europe: Diet, Medicine and Society, 1450–1800 (Bloomsbury, 2016)
 Goldman, Wendy Z. and Donald Filtzer, eds. Food Provisioning in the Soviet Union during World War II (2015)
 Roll, Eric. The Combined Food Board. A study in wartime international planning (1956), on World War II
 Rosen, William. The Third Horseman: Climate change and the great famine of the 14th century (Penguin, 2014).
 Scarpellini, Emanuela. Food and Foodways in Italy from 1861 to the Present (2014)

Great Britain
 Addyman, Mary et al. eds. Food, Drink, and the Written Word in Britain, 1820–1945 (Taylor & Francis, 2017).
 Barnett, Margaret. British Food Policy During the First World War (Routledge, 2014).
 Beveridge, W. H. British Food Control (1928), in World War I
 Brears, P. Cooking and Dining in Medieval England (2008) 
 Burnett, John. Plenty and want: a social history of diet in England from 1815 to the present day (2nd ed. 1979). A standard scholarly history.
 Collins, E.J.T. "Dietary change and cereal consumption in Britain in the nineteenth century." Agricultural History Review (1975) 23#2, 97-115.
 Gautier, Alban. "Cooking and cuisine in late Anglo-Saxon England." Anglo-Saxon England 41 (2012): 373–406.
 Gazeley, I. and Newell, A. "Urban working-class food consumption and nutrition in Britain in 1904" Economic History Review. (2014). http://onlinelibrary.wiley.com/doi/10.1111/ehr.12065/pdf. 
 Harris, Bernard, Roderick Floud, and Sok Chul Hong. "How many calories? Food availability in England and Wales in the eighteenth and nineteenth centuries". Research in economic history. (2015). 111-191. 
 Hartley, Dorothy. Food In England: A complete guide to the food that makes us who we are (Hachette UK, 2014).
 Mennell, Stephen. All Manners of Food: Eating and Taste in England and France from the Middle Ages to the Present (2nd ed U of Illinois Press, 1996) 
 Meredith, D. and Oxley, D. "Food and fodder: feeding England, 1700-1900." Past and Present (2014). (2014). 222:163-214.
 Oddy, Derek. From Plain Fare to Fusion Food: British Diet from the 1890s to the 1990s (Boydell Press, 2003).
 Oddy, D. " Food, drink and nutrition" in F.M.L. Thompson, ed., The Cambridge social history of Britain, 1750–1950. Volume 2. People and their environment (1990). pp. 2:251-78.
 Otter, Chris. "The British Nutrition Transition and its Histories", History Compass 10#11 (2012): pp. 812–825, [DOI]: 10.1111/hic3.12001
 Panayi, Panikos. Spicing Up Britain: The Multicultural History of British Food (2010)
 Spencer, Colin. British Food: An Extraordinary Thousand Years of History (2007).
 Woolgar. C.N. The Culture of Food in England, 1200–1500 (2016). 260 pp.,

United States
  Pendergrast, Mark. For God, Country, and Coca-Cola: The Definitive History of the Great American Soft Drink and the Company That Makes It (2013) 
 Shapiro, Laura. Something From the Oven: Reinventing Dinner in 1950s America, Viking Adult 2004, 
 Smith, Andrew F. ed. The Oxford companion to American food and drink (2007)
Veit, Helen Zoe, ed. Food in the Civil War Era: The North (Michigan State University Press, 2014)
Veit, Helen Zoe. Modern Food, Moral Food: Self-Control, Science, and the Rise of Modern American Eating in the Early Twentieth Century (University of North Carolina Press, 2013)
 Wallach, Jennifer Jensen. How America Eats: A social history of U.S. food and culture (2014) 256256pp
 Williams, Elizabeth M. New Orleans: A Food Biography (AltaMira Press, 2012).

Journals
Petits Propos Culinaires, first journal in the field
Food and Foodways. Explorations in the History and Culture of Human Nourishment
Food, Culture and Society: An International Journal of Multidisciplinary Research
Food & History, multilingual scientific journal about the history and culture of food published by the (IEHCA)
Global Food History, see website

Other languages
 Montanari, Massimo, Il mondo in cucina (The world in the kitchen). Laterza, 2002 ASIN: B0055J686G
 Mintalová - Zubercová, Zora: Všetko okolo stola I.(All around the table I.), Vydavateľstvo Matice slovenskej, 2009,

References

External links
University of Houston Digital Library: 1850-1860s Hotel and Restaurant Menu Collection images
: FOST: Social & Cultural Food Studies (VUB's research unit in food history)
Spanish Food History Articles: 27 most relevant products and Timeline by Enrique García Ballesteros
 
Explained With Maps - History of World Food (Documentary Video) 

History
Historical foods